Wyoming Highway 171 (WYO 171) is a  Wyoming state road located in northern Hot Springs County that serves the former town of Grass Creek and oil fields owned by Marathon Oil Company.

Route description
The actual population was unknown as of the 2000 census. Highway 171 travels southeasterly from Grass Creek, named Grass Creek Road, as it parallels the creek of the same name.

Major intersections

References

External links 

Wyoming State Routes 100-199
WYO 171 - WYO 120 to WYO 174

Transportation in Hot Springs County, Wyoming
171